Çatalca is a village in Tarsus district of Mersin Province, Turkey. It is situated in Çukurova (Cilicia of antiquity) to the south of Tarsus and to the west of Berdan River. The population of Çatalca was 66 as of 2011. Although situated in a fertile valley, the village suffers from frequent floods.

References

Villages in Tarsus District